Neoblastobasis laikipiae is a moth in the  family Blastobasidae. It is found in Kenya, where it is known from the Laikipia Plateau (the eastern escarpment of the Rift Valley).

The length of the forewings is 6.3 mm. The forewings are brownish grey intermixed with grey and pale grey. The hindwings are pale grey.

Etymology
The species epithet, laikipiae, is derived from the geographical locality (the Laikipia Plateau) where the species is known to occur.

References

Endemic moths of Kenya
Moths described in 2010
Blastobasidae
Moths of Africa